Cook's Bay or Cooks Bay may refer to:

Cook's Bay (Ontario), Canada
Cook's Bay (Moorea), French Polynesia
Cooks Bay (Minnesota)
Cooks Bay, offshore from the town of Cooks Beach, New Zealand

See also 
Cook Bay (disambiguation)